Moore Creek may refer to the following creeks:

 Moore Creek (Nipissing District), Ontario, Canada
 Moore Creek (Timiskaming District), Ontario, Canada
 Moore Creek (California), United States

See also
 Moores Creek (Reedy Fork tributary), Virginia, United States
 Mores Creek, Idaho, United States